The list of ship decommissionings in 2011 includes a chronological list of ships decommissioned in 2011.


See also

References

2011
 
Ship